Neogoezia is a genus of flowering plants belonging to the family Apiaceae.

It is native to Mexico.

The genus name of Neogoezia is in honour of Edmund Goeze (1838–1929), a German gardener and botanist. He was a botanical museum director in Coimbra, Portugal and also botanical garden inspector in Greifswald. 
It was first described and published in Bull. Misc. Inform. Kew 1894 on page 354 in 1894.

Known species
According to Kew:
Neogoezia breedlovei 
Neogoezia gracilipes 
Neogoezia macvaughii 
Neogoezia minor 
Neogoezia planipetala

References

Apioideae
Plants described in 1894
Flora of Mexico
Apioideae genera